The franc is the name of several currency units, most notably the French franc.

Franc or francs may refer also to:

People

Given name
 Franc Abulnar (1909–1995), Yugoslav cyclist
 Franc Breckerfeld (1681–1744), Slovenian theologian, mathematician, astronomer and latinist
 Franz Caucig (Slovene: Franc Kavčič) (1755–1828), neoclassical painter
 Franc Červan (1936–1991), Yugoslav long-distance runner
 Franc Cifer (born 1971), Slovenian retired footballer
 Franc Cvenkelj (1925–1997), Slovenian alpine skier
 Franc Fernandez, Argentine artist and fashion designer best known for creating Lady Gaga's meat dress
 Franciszek Fiszer (1860–1937), better known as Franc Fiszer, Polish bon-vivant, gourmand and philosopher
 Franc Flotron (born 1954), American former politician
 Franc Fridl (born 1972), Slovenian retired footballer
 Franc Grom (born c. 1940), Slovenian artist
 Franc Hafner (born 1936), Yugoslav middle-distance runner
 Franc Hočevar (1853–1919), Austrian–Slovenian mathematician
 Franc Joubin (1911–1997), American-born Canadian prospector and geologist
 Franc Kangler (born 1965), Slovenian politician
 Feri Lainšček (born Franc Lainšček in 1959), Slovenian writer, poet and screenwriter
 Franc Luz (born 1950), American actor
 Franz Miklosich a.k.a. Franc Miklošič (1813–1891), Slovenian philologist
 Franc Očko (born 1960), Slovenian judoka
 Franc Palme (born 1914), Slovenian former ski jumper
 Francis Xavier Pierz (Slovene: Franc Pirc or Franc Pirec) (1785–1880), Roman Catholic priest and missionary to the Ottawa and Ojibwe Indians
 Franc Reyes (disambiguation)
 Franc Roddam (born 1946), English film director, businessman, screenwriter, television producer and publisher
 Franc Rode (born 1934), Slovenian Roman Catholic cardinal
 Franc Rozman (1911–1944), Slovenian partisan commander in World War II
 Franc Škerlj (born 1941), Yugoslav former cyclist
 Franc Smolej (ice hockey) (born 1940), Slovenian ice hockey player
 Franc Smolej (skier) (1908–?), Yugoslav cross-country skier
 Franc Snoj (1902–1962), Slovenian politician and economist
 Ferenc Talányi (Slovene: Franc Talanyi or Talanji) (1883–1959), Slovenian writer, journalist and painter
 François Tétaz (born 1970), Australian film composer, music producer and mixer
 Franc Treiber (1809–1878), Slovenian Roman Catholic priest, poet and composer
 Franc Veliu (born 1988), Albanian footballer
 Franc Weerwind (born 1964), Dutch politician
 Franc Žitnik (born 1941), Yugoslav retired slalom canoeist

Surname
 André Franc (1911–1990s), French biologist and malacologist
 Caroline Franc (born 1971) French journalist, writer and screenwriter, also known as Caroline Desages
 Guillaume Franc (c. 1505 – 1571), French musician and composer active in Geneva and Lausanne
 Isabel Franc (born 1955), Spanish writer
 Leo Frank (lynched 1915)
 Livvi Franc, stage name of British Barbadian singer-songwriter Olivia Waithe (born 1988)
 Michal Franc (born 1967), Czech fencer
 Otto Franc ((1846–1903), German-born American cattle baron, sheriff and judge
 Urban Franc (born 1975), Slovenian former ski jumper

Other uses
 French name for the Franks
 Francs, Gironde, a commune of the Gironde département, in France
 Francs Peak, Wyoming, United States, named after Otto Franc

See also
 Marie Le Franc (1879–1964), French writer
 Martin le Franc (c. 1410–1461), French poet
 Franc Noir de la Haute-Saône, a traditional French variety of red wine grape

Masculine given names
Hypocorisms